Anthene sylvanus, the common indigo ciliate blue, is a butterfly in the family Lycaenidae. It is found in Senegal, Guinea-Bissau, Guinea, Sierra Leone, Burkina Faso, Liberia, Ivory Coast, Ghana, Togo, Benin, Nigeria, Cameroon, Gabon, the Republic of the Congo, the Central African Republic, the Democratic Republic of the Congo, Uganda and Tanzania. The habitat consists of forests and dense Guinea savanna.

Subspecies
Anthene sylvanus sylvanus (Senegal, Guinea-Bissau, Guinea, Sierra Leone, Burkina Faso, Liberia, Ivory Coast, Ghana, Togo, Benin, Nigeria: south and the Cross River loop, Cameroon, Gabon, Congo, Central African Republic, Democratic Republic of the Congo: Mongala, Uele, Ituri, Kivu, Tshopo, Kinshasa, Cataractes, Sankuru, Mamiema, Lualaba, Tanganika and Shaba)
Anthene sylvanus albicans (Grünberg, 1910) (southern Uganda, north-western Tanzania)
Anthene sylvanus niveus Stempffer, 1954 (Democratic Republic of the Congo: Equator)

References

Butterflies described in 1773
Anthene
Butterflies of Africa
Taxa named by Dru Drury